Gustav Piers Alexander von Bunge (19 January 1844, Dorpat – 5 November 1920, Basel) was a German physiologist known for work in the field of nutrition physiology. He was the son of botanist Alexander von Bunge (1803–1890).

Biography

In 1874 he received his degree in chemistry at the University of Dorpat, followed by a doctorate in medicine at the University of Leipzig in 1882. At Dorpat, he had as instructors, Friedrich Bidder (1810–1894) and Carl Schmidt (1822–1894). In 1885 he became an associate professor, and from 1886 until his death in 1920, he served as a professor of physiological chemistry at the University of Basel.

Among his more important studies were the interplay of potassium and sodium within the body; the association of sodium chloride with metabolism, and analytic studies of iron metabolism.

He was the author of treatises on alcoholic spirits, of which he denounced as a "threat to health and heredity". His name is associated with "Bunge's rule", a nutritional law based on his research of human and animal milk – "that nutrients in milk are proportional to the growth of the offspring".

Selected publications 

Der Vegetarianismus (Berlin, 1885; 2nd ed., 1900)
 The Alcohol Question, 1886.
Text-Book of Physiological and Pathological Chemistry, (translated from the fourth German edition by Florence A. Starling and edited by Ernest H. Starling, 1902).
 Alcoholic Poisoning and Degeneration, 1905.
 "Text-book of organic chemistry for medical students", 1907.

References

Further reading

Clive M. McCay. (1953). Gustav B. von Bunge: (January 19, 1844 – November 5, 1920). The Journal of Nutrition 49 (1): 1–19.

1844 births
1920 deaths
Baltic-German people
Dietitians
German nutritionists
German physiologists
German temperance activists
Leipzig University alumni
People from Kreis Dorpat
People from Tartu
Academic staff of the University of Basel
University of Tartu alumni